Mariano Friedick (born January 9, 1975 in Tarzana, California) is an American former professional cyclist.

Major results

1993
 2nd  Road race, UCI Junior Road World Championships
1994
 2nd  Team pursuit, UCI Track Cycling World Championships
1995
 2nd  Road race, Pan American Games
 3rd  Team pursuit, UCI Track Cycling World Championships
2001
 1st Stage 4 Tour of the Gila
2002
 2nd Tucson Bicycle Classic
2003
 1st Stage 2 Yuma North End Classic
2004
 1st Overall Valley of the Sun Stage Race
1st Stage 2
 1st Stage 1 Tour of Temecula
 1st Stage 4 San Dimas Stage Race
 2nd Tour de Temecula

References

External links

1975 births
Living people
American male cyclists
Olympic cyclists of the United States
Cyclists at the 1996 Summer Olympics
Cyclists at the 2000 Summer Olympics
Pan American Games medalists in cycling
Pan American Games gold medalists for the United States
Pan American Games silver medalists for the United States
American track cyclists
Cyclists at the 1995 Pan American Games
Medalists at the 1995 Pan American Games
20th-century American people
21st-century American people